Versam-Safien railway station is a station on the Reichenau-Tamins–Disentis/Mustér railway of the Rhaetian Railway in the Swiss canton of Graubünden. It is situated alongside the Anterior Rhine, in the railway's scenic passage through the Ruinaulta or Rhine Gorge.

Services
The following services stop at Versam-Safien:

Gallery

References

External links 
 
 

Railway stations in Graubünden
Rhaetian Railway stations
Safiental
Railway stations in Switzerland opened in 1903